Cobham Limited is a British aerospace  manufacturing company based in Bournemouth, England.

Cobham was originally founded by Sir Alan Cobham as Flight Refuelling Limited (FRL) in 1934. During 1939, British airline Imperial Airways performed several non-stop crossings of the Atlantic using equipment provided by FRL. During the late 1940s, the company's aerial refuelling equipment broke new ground, including a round-the-world flight by specially-equipped Boeing B-50 Superfortresses in 1948 and the demonstration of the now-widely used 'probe and drogue' method of air-to-air refuelling for the first time in 1949. A wide range of aircraft have since been equipped with Cobham's refuelling equipment.

The company has grown and diversified into various markets, often through acquisitions. Michael Cobham, Alan's son, took over its leadership during 1969. During 1994, the firm was formally renamed Cobham plc; by this point, the company had in excess of 10,000 employees and had operations in North America, Europe, Malaysia and South Africa. In January 2020, the company was acquired by American private equity firm Advent International for £4 billion and Cobham Mission Systems was sold to Eaton in June 2021 for $2.83 billion.

History

Formation and early activities
During the 1920s and 1930s, aerial refuelling of aircraft in mid-flight was performed only on an experimental basis, typically for attempts to set new flight endurance records. In this era, Alan Cobham became an accomplished pilot, winning multiple air races as well as the de Havilland aircraft company appointing him as their senior pilot. Alan decided to leave de Havilland to pursue his own ventures, including the formation of an aerobatic troupe and a small airline; he embarked on a long term campaign to popularise commercial air travel, making efforts to secure both public and the British Government's backing for the sector.

Alan believed that practical in-flight refuelling techniques would revolutionise commercial airlines and enable new long distance air routes; however, development work later focused largely upon its military applications. Accordingly, he founded a new company, known as Flight Refuelling Limited (FRL), in 1934. The company was initially headquartered at RAF Ford in Sussex. During 1939, the company played a role in several non-stop crossings of the Atlantic performed by British airline Imperial Airways; however, it would be the adoption of aerial refuelling by the United States Air Force during the initial post-war years that would perhaps most prominently highlight the technology's value.

During 1947, the company relocated to Tarrant Rushton in Dorset. The company developed the 'probe and drogue' method of air-to-air refuelling in 1949. The Royal Air Force (RAF) would soon adopt the probe-and-drogue approach, as would various other international customers. Cobham's air-to-air refuelling system was perhaps most crucially used during the Falklands War of 1982, being used to facilitate the long-distance sorties of the RAF's Avro Vulcan bombers for Operation Black Buck, successfully reaching and bombing the Argentinian-held airfield at Port Stanley on the islands.

During 1954, Michael Cobham, Alan's son, took a role in the company; he soon began to steer Cobham to diversify into new markets. One such venture was the reorganising of Cobham Group's Airfield Services division into the newly incorporated FR Aviation, which saw contractor-owned and operated aircraft operate directly alongside military customers. Communications and electronics were other key sectors of interest. During 1969, Michael took over the leadership of the business from Alan; he remained as Cobham's chairman and chief executive through to the mid 1990s.

In 1963, the firm centred its manufacturing activity at its new site at Wimborne in Dorset. During 1985, Cohbam became a public limited company; despite the stock flotation, the Cobham family retained a large stake in the business. As a consequence of various acquisitions and internal growth, Cobham developed various product lines across the aerospace market for both civilian and military, and thus its in-flight refuelling technology became a relatively small element of Cobham's portfolio over time.

In 1994, the firm was formally renamed Cobham plc. By this time, the company had in excess of 10,000 employees and had operations present in North America, Europe, Malaysia and South Africa.

Sales and acquisitions
In September 1997, Cobham acquired ML Aviation for £37 million, which had taken over Nash & Thompson, a major competitor, the previous year.

In early 2008, Cobham purchased S-TEC Corporation, maker of general aviation autopilots, for $38 million; during February 2008, the company also bought the sensor and antenna systems division of BAE Systems for $240 million. In June 2008, Cobham acquired Sparta Inc., a US defence business, for $416 million (it was renamed Cobham Analytic Solutions). In September 2008 Cobham completed the purchase of the radio frequency components business of M/A-COM for $425 million. In April 2009, Cobham agreed to purchase Argotek Inc., a provider of high-end information assurance services to the United States Intelligence Community, for $36 million. In June 2009, a Cobham – Northrop Grumman 50–50 joint venture won the US Army's US$2.4 billion competition to supply Vehicular Intercom Systems.

In October 2011, Cobham Analytic Solutions was sold for $350 million to the privately owned Parsons Corporation. Then in June 2012, Cobham acquired Danish satellite communications company Thrane & Thrane A/S, making it the core of Cobham's new SATCOM strategic business unit (SBU), to include SeaTel marine, TracStar land and Omnipless airborne SATCOM product lines.

In May 2013, Cobham acquired antenna systems business, Axell Wireless. In July 2013, the company bought out FB Heliservices joint venture partner Bristow Helicopters. In April 2014, Cobham sold Chelton Flight Systems and S-TEC Corporation to Genesys Aerosystems. Then in May 2014, Cobham acquired wireless communications company, Aeroflex Holding Corporation for $1.46 billion.

In August 2016, David Lockwood was named CEO, replacing Bob Murphy.

In July 2019, the company's board agreed to recommend a takeover offer of £4 billion from American private equity firm Advent International. However, the bid was criticised by Cobham's largest shareholder, and the firm's chairman subsequently remarked that Cobham was seeking out alternative offers. In response, Advent issued several guarantees, seeking to mollify national security concerns ahead of pending approval of the deal by the British Government. The UK Conservative government approved the takeover in December 2019. The transaction was completed on 17 January 2020. The communications division was sold off in November 2020 to TransDigm Group Inc. for $965 million.

After 18 months, Advent had already sold the bulk of Cobham’s operations to other buyers, leaving it with no UK manufacturing operations.

On 1 June 2021, Eaton completed their acquisition of Cobham Mission Systems for $2.83 billion.

In September 2020, Draken International purchased Cobham Aviation Services based in Bournemouth and Teesside International Airport, UK, and renamed it Draken Europe. Cobham's 15 Dassault Falcon 20 aircraft, were added to Draken's fleet.

Operations

Cobham is organised into three sectors:
 Cobham Advanced Electronic Solutions or CAES specializes in space-qualified microelectronics as well as RF and microwave components for radar, communication and electronic warfare systems, and is the world leader in advanced tactical military vehicle intercom systems.
 Cobham Aviation Services Australia.
 Cobham Communications and Connectivity.

Products
The company produces the Guardian ST820, a battery-operated tracing device used by the American intelligence agency FBI. The device, which is only available to law enforcement entities, can be secured underneath a car by a strong magnet and incorporates a GPS receiver.

In his 2015 book Data and Goliath, American security expert Bruce Schneier wrote that Cobham sells a system enabling buyers to send "blind calls" to mobile phones: calls that don't ring, and are undetectable by the recipient. As described by Schneier, the blind call allows the sender to track the phone's location to within one metre. Schneier noted that Cobham's customers include the governments of Algeria, Brunei, Ghana, Pakistan, Saudi Arabia, Singapore and the United States.

Rebreathers
Carleton Life Support, a subsidiary of Cobham based in Davenport, Iowa, makes the MK 16 rebreather used by the United States Navy. and the Siva range of diving rebreathers, originally made by Fullerton Sherwood Engineering Ltd.  They are:
 Siva S10 oxygen rebreather, with a dive duration rated as 4 hours, which is worn on the chest.
 Siva S24, a dual mode oxygen or semi-closed circuit mixed gas rebreather with maximum operating depth normally limited to 24 metres, but can be set to 55 metres, which is worn on the chest.
 Siva-55 is worn on the back. It has two 200 bar Inconel spheres with a total volume of 5.6 litres. It is superseded by the Carleton Viper The Siva 55, also known as Canadian Clearance Diving Apparatus (CCDA), is rated for an operating depth up to 55 metres. It can be used as a semi-closed circuit rebreather with any one of 3 standard nitrox mixes (32.5, 40 and 60% oxygen) or as a closed circuit oxygen rebreather.
 Siva+ is worn on the back. It is also known as Canadian Underwater Mine-countermeasure Apparatus (CUMA). It is a self-mixing rebreather which works on the principle of a flow of oxygen which is mixed with a diluent to a ratio dependent on the ambient pressure. The setpoint is electronically controlled based on input from an oxygen partial pressure measuring sensor. The Siva+ is rated for 90 metres. The diluent can be air or trimix or heliox.
 Viper

Queen's Awards for Enterprise
 2007: Cobham Defense Communications, based in Blackburn, Lancashire, received a Queen's Award for Enterprise in the International Trade category. The business was awarded the award for its ability to supply leading edge intercom systems to customers around the world. 
 2009: Cobham Surveillance, based in Segensworth, Hampshire, England, received a Queen's Award for Enterprise in the International Trade category.  The business – formerly known as Domo Ltd – tripled its export sales in three years.
 2010: Cobham Surveillance, based in Segensworth, Hampshire, received a Queen's Award for Enterprise in the Innovation category.  The award was for the development of its Solo4 wireless digital audio and video link technology that improves safety for bomb disposal teams and law enforcement personnel by increasing the range at which they can effectively operate their robotic bomb disposal equipment.
 2010: Cobham Antenna Systems, based in Marlow, Buckinghamshire, received a Queen's Award for Enterprise in the International Trade category. The business – formerly known as Chelton Ltd – continuously increased export revenues over six years and sells over 80% of its production overseas.

Sports club
The company originally created Cobham Sports and Social Club, a members' club in Merley near the main manufacturing site in Wimborne, Dorset in 1971.  Whilst this club is now in private ownership (no longer part of Cobham), it still uses the Cobham branding and is used as the ground for Merley Cobham Sports F.C.

See also

References

Bibliography

External links
 
 A 1950 Flight Refuelling Limited advert
 A picture of a Flight Refuelling Lancaster refuelling another using the early looped-hose method
  "Gas Station In The Sky" 1947 article on FLR's first in-flight refueling system
 "F.R. Equipment Speeds Refuelling!", a 1951 advert for Flight Refuelling's pressure refuelling system as used on the de Havilland Comet

Aircraft component manufacturers of the United Kingdom
Air refueling
Manufacturing companies established in 1934
British companies established in 1934
Companies based in Dorset
Companies formerly listed on the London Stock Exchange
Defence companies of the United Kingdom
Rebreather makers
Diving equipment manufacturers
Wimborne Minster
1934 establishments in England
British brands
Private equity portfolio companies
2020 mergers and acquisitions